Marvi is a Pakistani drama series broadcast on Pakistan Television Corporation (PTV) in 1993. It was a modern version of a Sindhi folktale, "Umar Marvi". It starred Ghazal Siddique as Marvi and Hassam Qazi as Umar. It was adapted by Noor-ul-Huda Shah and directed by Sultana Siddiqui. Mahnoor Baloch debuted in the series in a supporting role.

Plot summary
The story is about a village girl named Marvi who goes to the city to study, with the aim to come back to her village and improve the living conditions for the people there. Things do not go according to plan, and she faces many hardships. Marvi's possessive lover, Umar, played by Hassam Qazi, becomes so obsessed with her that he changes into a different person. He asks his friend Akbar, a feudal lord, for help. Akbar kidnaps Marvi without Umar's knowledge. When Umar finds out, he becomes very angry at Akbar, but later, after Akbar threatens to kill Marvi, Umar becomes a silent spectator. When Marvi pleads for help, Umar helps her escape. With the help of feudal lords, villagers and police try to kill Marvi for having bad character. Marvi escapes and goes to her female boss, for whom she worked as an editor. She helps Marvi file a petition against Umar and Akbar for killing her cousin. When the case is about to be decided in favor of the feudal lords, leaving Marvi as the culprit, Umar confesses that he is in love with Marvi and had helped in her kidnapping. He says at the end that he loves Marvi.

Cast 
 Ghazal Siddique as Marvi
 Hassam Qazi as Umar. Laila's brother who returns home from studying abroad and falls in love with Marvi.
 Mahnoor Baloch as Laila, Marvi's roommate and friend. Umar's younger sister. 
 Badar Khalil as Umar and Laila's mother
 Qaiser Khan Nizamani as Akbar Ali, Laila's fiancé and cousin. 
 Mahmood Siddiqui as Umar and Laila's father, a politician and landlord.
 Noor Muhammad Lashari as Marvi's father, the village school teacher.
 Manzoor Murad as Kheth, Marvi's cousin and fiancé. 
 Roshan Atta as Marvi's mother
 Anwar Solangi as Akbar Ali's father. Umar and Laila's paternal uncle (phopha). Landlord of Marvi's village.
 Asad Qureshi
 Sheema Kirmani as the editor of the Roshni newspaper 
 Anwar Baloch

References 

1993 Pakistani television series debuts
1993 Pakistani television series endings
Pakistani drama television series
1990s Pakistani television series
Sindhi culture
Mass media in Sindh